The 1962 United States Senate election in New Hampshire took place on November 6, 1962. Incumbent Republican Senator Norris Cotton won re-election to a second full term.

Primary elections
Primary elections were held on September 11, 1962.

Democratic primary

Candidates
Alfred Catalfo Jr., attorney

Results

Republican primary

Candidates
Norris Cotton, incumbent United States Senator
Norman A. LePage, accountant

Results

General election

Results

See also 
 1962 United States Senate elections

References

Bibliography
 
 
 

1962
New Hampshire
United States Senate